Final league standings for the 1916-17 St. Louis Soccer League.

History
The St. Louis Soccer League was reestablished this season after the league had split into two competing blocks of teams during the previous two seasons.

League standings

External links
St. Louis Soccer Leagues (RSSSF)
The Year in American Soccer - 1917

1916-17
1916–17 domestic association football leagues
1916–17 in American soccer
St. Louis Soccer
St. Louis Soccer